Group B of the 2021 CONCACAF Gold Cup took place from 11 to 18 July 2021 in Frisco's Toyota Stadium and Kansas City's Children's Mercy Park. The group consisted of Canada, Haiti, Martinique, and host nation the United States.

Teams

Notes

Standings

In the quarter-finals:

The winners of Group B, the United States, advanced to play the runners-up of Group C, Jamaica.
The runners-up of Group B, Canada, advanced to play the winners of Group C, Costa Rica.

Matches

Canada vs Martinique

United States vs Haiti

Haiti vs Canada

Martinique vs United States

Martinique vs Haiti

United States vs Canada

Discipline
Fair play points would have been used as a tiebreaker should the overall and head-to-head records of teams were tied. These were calculated based on yellow and red cards received in all group matches as follows:
first yellow card: minus 1 point;
indirect red card (second yellow card): minus 3 points;
direct red card: minus 4 points;
yellow card and direct red card: minus 5 points;

Only one of the above deductions was applied to a player in a single match.

References

External links
 

Group B